Winisk 90 is a First Nation reserve and ghost town in the Kenora District in Northern Ontario, situated along the Winisk River. It was destroyed in the 1986 Winisk Flood. After the flood, the residents of the Weenusk First Nation were forced to re-locate to Peawanuck, 30 km inland.

Winisk was home to Royal Canadian Air Force Station Winisk, a Mid-Canada Line radar control station from 1958 to 1965.

The town was served by Winisk Airport (YWN) via a 6,000 feet plus gravel runway which can still be seen. In 1964, Transair (Canada) was operating scheduled weekly roundtrip passenger flights with Douglas DC-4 propliners on a Montreal - Ottawa - Winisk - Churchill, Manitoba routing.

References

 
 Indigenous and Northern Affairs Canada profile
 Airline service reference [1]:   https://www.timetableimages.com/ttimages/tz/tz6409/tz6409-2.jpg

Ghost towns in Northern Ontario
Communities in Kenora District
Swampy Cree